Natanael Cano (born May 1, 2001) is a Mexican rapper and singer-songwriter. He is best known for the unique blend of traditional Mexican corridos and American hip hop music. Cano was the first musician to publicly fuse this variant of the two genres together which has made him stand out.  This genre was dubbed corridos tumbados. The idea to fuse the two genres was proposed by Dan Sanchez whom wrote Natanael's first corrido tumbado, "Soy El Diablo".

Early life
Cano was born in Hermosillo, Sonora. When Cano was nine, he showed off his talent at family events and parties or wherever he was invited. When he first taught himself to play the guitar at thirteen, he learned Mexican band Maná's "Rayando el Sol" off of YouTube. Then he focused on regional Mexican corridos like the ones by Ariel Camacho who was his main source of inspiration. Three years later at sixteen, when he dropped out of school, he released his first song on YouTube "El de los lentes Gucci" where he first fused hip-hop/trap with corridos, which he now refers to as corridos tumbados.

Music career
At the beginning of his career, Cano primarily upload videos guitar covers to YouTube and later grew into performing underground. Cano signed to the Los Angeles-based urban regional Mexican label Rancho Humilde in March 2019. The label's founder, Jimmy Humilde was looking to sign more urban regional corridos singers and after watching Cano on an Instagram video in early 2019, he decided to fly Cano out to Los Angeles and eventually signed him. Humilde keeps Cano grounded, constantly reminding him that he "can achieve great things if he doesn't get lost in the journey". 

Cano also has partnerships with Warner Music Latin  and Apple Music. Cano was the first musician to fuse this variant of the two genres together which has made him stand out, which has led him to be the first Mexican to be recognized as the artist of the month through Apple Music Up Next, "a show aimed at discovering rising stars that in previous years advanced several of today's top talents". This accomplishment on Apple's huge platform shows that Cano, at the age of nineteen beat 300 million songs since his debut in 2019 and shows that he is the number one regional Mexican artist from his category of music.

Corridos tumbados: combining trap music with the sounds of regional Mexican music 
The fusion of trap music and regional Mexican corridos known as corridos tumbados were born in Los Angeles where Cano arrived with Rancho Humilde to showcase his talents. Cano is best known for his creation of corridos tumbados which are inspired in the traditional songs of Mexico and combine the lyrics of trap music and sometimes hip-hop. He could be considered the king of corridos tumbados because he has been recognized for his interpretation of this subgenre of corridos. Cano states that the genre of music he specializes on is "the sound of regional Mexican music but with the sound of the new generation that young musicians added". Traditional corridos have consisted of daily tragedies, conflicts and even stories about crime with the subgenres like narcocorridos and lumbre corridos. Before his album, "A Mis 20," he has stemmed away from his origins and mostly focused on trap corridos like in his albums "Las Torres 3," "Soy El Nata," and "Trap Tumbado". Cano turned his focus back to corridos tumados because he said he that that is his main focus right now.

Influences and Inspiration 
Throughout the earlier stages of Cano's music career, Cano was heavily influenced by corridos he grew up listening performed by regional Mexican artists Gerardo Ortíz and Ariel Camacho.  Cano says that he if he could see any artist perform dead or alive, it would be Ariel Camacho since he died before Cano got a chance to see him in concert.  By his late teens, he became inspired by a corrido group from Orange County, California, Legado 7, known best for their "lumbre corridos" (fire corridos) which they became known for since they broke traditional values and wrote lyrics about weed. Cano's songs are influenced by experiences in his personal life or of his friends. His lyrics are based on events that he has gone through in his life. As a big fan of musicians like Bad Bunny, Jhay Cortez, and J Balvin, Cano is musically inspired by them.

Goals 
Cano mentions that his goal is to collaborate with many different Latin trap artists but he wants the collaborations to happen naturally, not be force.  Cano's dream collaboration would be with Anuel AA and that he is the top collaboration he would like follow through with. In an interview through Univision, Cano admitted that he also would like to collaborate with Mickey Woods Jr., Bad Bunny, and Myke Towers.

Awards 

 Premio Juventud for Spicy Regional Song
 Premio Juventud for New Regional Mexican Generation
 Premio Juventud for OMG Collaboration

Discography

Studio albums

Extended plays

Singles 

Notes

Tours 

 Tumbando Tour Mexico

References

External Links 

 Natanael Cano at Spotify
Natanael Cano at YouTube

2001 births
Mexican male singer-songwriters
Mexican singer-songwriters
Living people
Mexican hip hop musicians
Musicians from Sonora
People from Hermosillo
21st-century Mexican male singers